Johan Daniel Mårtensson (born 16 February 1989) is a Swedish professional footballer who plays as a midfielder for Greek Super League club Panetolikos.

Club career

GAIS
During his career at GAIS, he first came from the third-tier club Skövde AIK and, therefore, had some time to adapt to compete at a higher level. Mårtensson progressed pretty fast, and he shortly became a key player at GAIS's midfield. He showed that he was a great box to box player with good stamina, but also good vision for the game that worked out well with his capable technique. Although he's quite young and been capped several times for the Swedish U21 team, he is a bit underrated, maybe because GAIS isn't one of the biggest clubs in Allsvenskan. During the 2011 season of Allsvenskan, Mårtensson had improved even more since the season before and showed that on the pitch. A bunch of European clubs were following him, with especially some sharp eyes from the Dutch club of FC Utrecht.

FC Utrecht
On 9 July 2011, both GAIS and FC Utrecht confirmed that Mårtensson had signed a four-year contract with the Dutch side. It was an undisclosed fee, but Mårtensson was valued at about 1.5 million Euros at that time.

International career
Mårtensson was included in the Sweden squad for their friendly against Ivory Coast on 15 January 2015, scoring on his debut.

Career statistics

International
International goals
Score and result list Sweden's goal tally first.

References

External links
 Voetbal International profile 
 

1989 births
Living people
Swedish footballers
Swedish expatriate footballers
Ettan Fotboll players
Allsvenskan players
Super League Greece players
Skövde AIK players
GAIS players
FC Utrecht players
Helsingborgs IF players
Örebro SK players
Panetolikos F.C. players
Eredivisie players
Expatriate footballers in the Netherlands
Swedish expatriate sportspeople in the Netherlands
Expatriate footballers in Greece
Swedish expatriate sportspeople in Greece
Sweden youth international footballers
Sweden under-21 international footballers
Sweden international footballers
Association football midfielders
People from Skövde Municipality
Sportspeople from Västra Götaland County